Please add names of notable painters with a Wikipedia page, in precise English alphabetical order, using U.S. spelling conventions. Country and regional names refer to where painters worked for long periods, not to personal allegiances.

Joris van der Haagen (c. 1615–1669), Dutch painter
Cornelis van Haarlem (1562–1638), Dutch painter and draftsman
John Haberle (1858–1933), American painter
Jan Hackaert (1628–1685), Dutch painter
Jacob Philipp Hackert (1737–1807), German/Italian landscape painter
Johannes van Haensbergen (1642–1705), Dutch painter
Karl Hagedorn (1889–1969), German/English painter and illustrator
Karl Hagedopoorn (1922–2005), German/American painter, lithographer and etcher
Sally Haley (1908–2007), American painter
Adélaïde Victoire Hall (1772–1844), French artist and noblewoman
Patrick Hall (1906–1992), English landscape painter
Thomas Symington Halliday (1902–1998), Scottish painter and sculptor
Hallsteinn Sigurðsson (born 1945), Icelandic sculptor and artist
Dirck Hals (1591–1656), Dutch painter
Frans Hals (1580–1666), Dutch painter
Elaine Hamilton (1920–2010), American painter and muralist
Gavin Hamilton (1723–1798), Scottish/Italian painter
Gawen Hamilton (1698–1737), Scottish/English painter
Maggie Hamilton (1867–1952), Scottish painter
Richard Hamilton (1922–2011), English painter and collage artist
Doc Hammer (born 1978), American artist, musician and actor
Wilhelm Hammershøi (1864–1916), Danish painter
Frederick Hammersley (1919–2009), American painter
Hermione Hammond (1910–2005), English painter
Nina Hamnett (1890–1956), Welsh artist and writer
Han Gan (韩干/韓幹, 706–783), Chinese painter
Raymond Han (born 1931), American painter
Hanabusa Itchō (英一蝶, 1652–1724), Japanese painter, calligrapher and poet
Hanabusa Itchō II (二代英一蝶, 1677–1737), Japanese painter
Jakob Emanuel Handmann (1718–1781), Swiss portrait painter
Jakob Häne (1913–1978), Swiss painter
Adriaen Hanneman (1603–1671), Dutch painter
Armin Hansen (1886–1957), American painter
Constantin Hansen (1804–1880), Danish painter
William Harnett (1848–1892), American painter
Henri Harpignies (1819–1916), French landscape painter
George Frederick Harris (1856–1924), Welsh/Australian painter
Lawren Harris (1885–1970), Canadian painter
Lawrence Harris (born 1937), American painter
Tracy Harris (born 1958), American painter
Marsden Hartley (1877–1943), American painter, poet and essayist
Archibald Standish Hartrick (1864–1950), Scottish painter and print-maker
Hans Hartung (1904–1992), German/French painter
Gertrude Harvey (1879–1966), English painter
Harold Harvey (1874–1941), English painter
Paul Harvey (born 1960), English artist and musician
Hasegawa Settan (長谷川雪旦, died 1843), Japanese artist
Hasegawa Tōhaku (長谷川等伯, 1539–1610), Japanese painter
Maryam Hashemi (born 1977), Iranian/English painter
Hashimoto Gahō (橋本雅邦, 1835–1908), Japanese painter
Childe Hassam (1859–1935), American painter
Fathi Hassan (born 1597), Arab/Scottish installation artist
Julius Hatofsky (1922–2006), American painter
Julian Hatton (born 1956), American artist
Haukur Halldórsson (born 1937), Icelandic artist and illustrator
Lars Jonson Haukaness (1863–1929), Norwegian/Canadian painter and art instructor
Rudolf Hausner (1914–1995), Austrian painter, draftsman and sculptor
Sam Havadtoy (born 1952), Hungarian/American interior designer and painter
Karel Havlíček (1907–1988), Czechoslovak (Czech) painter
Jane Hawkins (1841–1904), English portrait painter
David Ramsay Hay (1798–1866), Scottish artist and interior decorator
Peter Alexander Hay (1866–1952), Scottish water-colorist
Gyoshū Hayami (速水御舟, 1894–1935), Japanese painter
Colin Hayes (1919–2003), English painter and teacher of art
Francesco Hayez (1791–1882), Italian painter
Martin Johnson Heade (1818–1904), American painter
Isobel Heath (1908–1989), English painter and poet
Ernest Hébert (1817–1908), French academic painter
Jeanne Hébuterne (1898–1920), French painter and model
Erich Heckel (1883–1970), German painter and print-maker
Willem Claeszoon Heda (1594–1680), Dutch painter
Cornelis de Heem (1631–1695), Flemish/Dutch painter
Jan Davidsz. de Heem (1606–1683), Dutch/Flemish painter
Egbert van Heemskerck (1610–1680), Dutch/English painter
Henry Heerup (1907–1993), Danish painter and sculptor
Franz Hegi (1774–1850), Swiss painter
François Joseph Heim (1787–1865), French painter
Wilhelm Heise (1892–1965), German painter
Johannes Heisig (born 1953), German painter and graphic artist
Bettina Heinen-Ayech (1937-2020), German painter
Joseph Heintz the Elder (1564–1609), Swiss/Bohemian painter, draftsman and architect
Jean Hélion (1904–1987), French painter
Dirk Helmbreker (1633–1696), Dutch painter
Gottfried Helnwein (born 1948), Austrian/Irish painter and draftsman
Francis Helps (1890–1972), English painter, draftsman and art teacher
Bartholomeus van der Helst (1613–1670), Dutch painter
Jan Davidsz de Hem (1606–1683), Flemish/Dutch painter
Andrew Henderson (1783–1835), Scottish painter
Elsie Henderson (1880–1967), English painter and sculptor
Jeremy Henderson (1952–2009), Irish/English painter
John Henderson (1860–1924), Scottish painter and Director of the Glasgow School of Art
Joseph Henderson (1832–1908), Scottish painter
Keith Henderson (1883–1982), Scottish painter and illustrator
Jean-Jacques Henner (1829–1905), French painter
Joseph Morgan Henninger (1906–1999), American painter, sculptor and illustrator
Robert Henri (1865–1929), American painter and teacher
Rose Henriques (1889–1972), English artist and charity worker
David Eugene Henry (born 1946), American painter and sculptor
Edward Lamson Henry (1841–1919), American painter
George Henry (1858–1943), Scottish painter
Paul Henry (1877–1958), Irish landscape painter
Norman Hepple (1908–1994), English portrait painter
Auguste Herbin (1882–1960), French painter
Hubert von Herkomer (1849–1914), German/English painter, film director and composer
George Herms, (born 1935), American assemblagist, teacher, painter
John Frederick Herring, Jr. (1820–1907), English painter
John Frederick Herring, Sr. (1795–1865), English painter, sign-maker and coachman
Louis Hersent (1777–1860), French painter
Heinrich Herzig (1887–1964), Swiss painter
F. Scott Hess (born 1955), American painter and conceptual artist
Carle Hessay (1911–1978), German/Canadian painter
Magnus Colcord Heurlin (1895–1986) Swedish/American artist
Jacob de Heusch (1657–1701), Dutch painter
Prudence Heward (1896–1947), Canadian painter
Elsie Dalton Hewland (1901–1979), English artist
Cicely Hey (1896–1980), English painter and sculptor
Jean Hey (fl. 1475–1505), Netherlandish/Burgundian painter
Jan van der Heyden (1637–1712), Dutch painter, draftsman and print-maker
Hugo Heyrman (born 1942), Belgian painter, film-maker and researcher
Edward Hicks (1780–1849), American painter and Quaker minister
Hidari Jingorō (左甚五郎, fl. 1596–1644), Japanese artist, possibly fictitious
Kaii Higashiyama (東山魁夷, 1908–1999), Japanese artist and writer
Amelia Robertson Hill (1821–1904), Scottish artist and sculptor
David Octavius Hill (1802–1870), Scottish painter and illustrator
Derek Hill (1916–2000), English/Irish painter
Thomas Hill (1829–1908), English/American painter
Nicholas Hilliard (c. 1547–1619), English miniature painter, goldsmith and limner
Charles Hinman (born 1932), American painter
Walter Haskell Hinton, American painter and illustrator
Sadamichi Hirasawa (平沢貞通, 1892–1987), Japanese tempera painter
Un'ichi Hiratsuka (平塚運一, 1895–1997), Japanese print-maker
Ikuo Hirayama (平山郁夫, 1930–2009), Japanese nihonga painter
Adolf Hirémy-Hirschl (1860–1933), Hungarian painter
Hirosada II (廣貞, fl. 1850s – 1860s), Japanese woodblock print-maker
Hiroshige (広重, 1797–1858), Japanese ukiyo-e artist and print-maker
Damien Hirst (born 1965), English artist, entrepreneur and art collector
Hishida Shunsō (菱田春草, 1874–1911), Japanese painter
Hishikawa Moronobu (菱川師宣, 1618–1694), Japanese ukiyo-e woodblock printer and painter
George Hitchcock (1850-1913)
D. Howard Hitchcock (1861–1943), American painter
Adolf Hitler (1889-1945), Austrian painter
Sigrid Hjertén (1885–1948), Swedish painter
Prince Hoare (c. 1711–1769), English sculptor
Prince Hoare (1755–1834), English painter and dramatist
William Hoare (c. 1707–1792), English painter and print-maker
Meindert Hobbema (1638–1709), Dutch painter
David Hockney (born 1937), English painter, print-maker and photographer
Eliot Hodgkin (1905–1987), English painter
Howard Hodgkin (born 1932), English painter and print-maker
Frances Hodgkins (1869–1947), New Zealand painter
Ferdinand Hodler (1853–1918), Swiss painter
Karl Hofer (1878–1955), German painter
Margo Hoff (1910–2008), American painter
E. T. A. Hoffmann (1776–1822), German artist, author and composer
Wlastimil Hofman (1881–1970), Polish painter
Hans Hofmann (1880–1866), German/American artist
Heinrich Hofmann (1824–1911), German painter
William Hogarth (1697–1764), English painter, satirist and cartoonist
Hokusai (葛飾北斎, 1760–1849), Japanese painter and print-maker
Francisco de Holanda (1517–1585), Portuguese court painter, architect and sculptor
Ambrosius Holbein (1494–1519), German/Swiss painter, draftsman and print-maker
Hans Holbein the Elder (c. 1465–1524), German painter
Hans Holbein the Younger (c. 1497–1543), German painter and print-maker
Wenceslas Hollar (1607–1677), Bohemian/English graphic artist
Ruth Hollingsworth (1880–1945), English painter
Itshak Holtz (born 1925), Polish/Israeli painter
Winslow Homer (1836–1910), American painter and print-maker
Jin Homura (born 1948), Japanese painter
Hiroshi Honda (1910–1970), American painter
Gijsbert d'Hondecoeter (1604–1653), Dutch painter
Gillis d'Hondecoeter (1575–1638), Dutch painter
Melchior d'Hondecoeter (1636–1695), Dutch animal painter
Abraham Hondius (1625–1691), Dutch painter
Henricus Hondius II (1597–1651), Dutch engraver and cartographer
Willem Hondius (1598–1658), Dutch/Danzig engraver, cartographer and painter
Nathaniel Hone (1718–1784), Irish/English portrait and miniature painter
Hong Ren (弘仁, 1610–1664), Chinese painter and monk
Villard de Honnecourt (13th c.), French artist
Gerald van Honthorst (1590–1656), Dutch painter
Pieter de Hooch (1629–1684), Dutch painter
Samuel Dirksz van Hoogstraten (1627–1678), Dutch painter, poet and art theorist
Charles Hopkinson (1869–1962), American painter
Carl Hoppe (1897–1981), American painter
Edward Hopper (1882–1967), American painter and print-maker
Istvan Horkay (born 1945), Hungarian painter
Edward Atkinson Hornel (1864–1933), Scottish painter
Elmyr de Hory (1906–1976), Hungarian/American painter and forger
Oluf Høst (1884–1966), Danish painter
Anna Hotchkis (1885–1984), Scottish artist, writer and art lecturer
Gerard Houckgeest (1600–1661), Dutch painter
Ken Howard (born 1932), English painter
Ray Howard-Jones (1903–1996), English painter
Youssef Howayek (1883–1962), Lebanese painter and sculptor
Adolf Hölzel (1853–1934), German painter
Hristofor Žefarović (18th c.), Ottoman (South Slav) painter, engraver and poet
Hu Jieqing (胡絜青, 1905–2001), Chinese painter
Hu Zao (胡慥, 17th, 18th or 19th c.), Chinese painter
Hu Zaobin (胡藻斌, 1897–1942), Chinese painter
Hua Yan (華嵒, 1682–1756), Chinese painter
Huang Binhong (黃賓虹, 1865–1955), Chinese painter and art historian
Huang Ding (黃鼎, 1650–1730), Chinese painter and poet
Huang Gongwang (黃公望, 1269–1354), Chinese painter, poet and writer
Huang Ji (黃濟, 17th, 18th or 19th c.), Chinese imperial painter
Huang Shen (黃慎, 1687–1772), Chinese painter
Huang Tingjian (黃庭堅, 1045–1105), Chinese calligrapher, painter and poet
Jean Huber Voltaire (1721–1786), Swiss painter
Wolf Huber (c. 1485 – 1553), Austrian painter, print-maker and architect
Erlund Hudson (1912–2011), English watercolorist
Juergen von Huendeberg (1922–1996), German abstract painter
Arthur Hughes (1832–1915)
Edward Robert Hughes (1851–1914), Welsh artist
Eleanor Hughes (1882–1952), New Zealand landscape painter
Hugh Hughes (1790–1863), Welsh painter, engraver and writer
Robert Alwyn Hughes (born 1935), Welsh artist
Emperor Huizong of Song (1082–1135)
Friedensreich Hundertwasser (1928–2000)
Georgina Hunt (1922–2012), English abstract painter
William Holman Hunt (1827–1910), English painter and a founder of the Pre-Raphaelite Brotherhood
John Kelso Hunter (1802–1873), Scottish painter and author
Beatrice Huntington (1889–1988), Scottish painter, sculptor and musician
M. F. Husain (1915–2011), Indian painter
Jakub Husnik (1837–1916), Austro-Hungarian (Czech) painter, art teacher and inventor
John Hutchison (1832–1910), Scottish sculptor
Vasile Hutopila (born 1953) Romanian (Ukrainian) painter
John Hutton (born 1948) New Zealand/English glass engraver
Pieter Huys (1519–1584), Flemish painter
Jan van Huysum (1682–1749), Dutch painter

References
References can be found under each entry.

H